California's 6th district may refer to:

 California's 6th congressional district
 California's 6th State Assembly district
 California's 6th State Senate district